Daniele Franco (born 7 June 1953) is an Italian economist, central banker and civil servant who served as Minister of Economy and Finance in the cabinet of Prime Minister Mario Draghi from 2021 to 2022. From 2020 until 2021, he served as director-general of the Bank of Italy.

Early life and education
Franco graduated from the University of Padua in 1977 with a degree in political science. In 1978, he obtained a masters degree in business organisation from the University Consortium of Business Organization of Padua. In 1979 he obtained a master's degree in economics from the University of York, Great Britain

Career
In 1979, Franco joined the Bank of Italy.

From 1994 to 1997, Franco was economic advisor to the Directorate-General for Economic and Financial Affairs of the European Commission. From 1997 to 2007, he again worked at the Bank of Italy, where he was director of the public finance section of the Research Department.

From 17 May 2013 to 14 May 2019, Franco served as president of the State General Accounting Office. From 20 May to 31 December 2019 he was Deputy Director-General of the Bank of Italy, after which point he became Director-General.

On 13 February 2021, Franco was appointed Minister of Finance and Economy in the Draghi cabinet. In this capacity, he chaired the meetings of G20 Ministers of Finance when Italy held the group's presidency in 2021.

Other activities

European Union institutions
 European Investment Bank (EIB), Ex-Officio Member of the Board of Governors (since 2021)
 European Stability Mechanism (ESM), Member of the Board of Governors (since 2021)

International organizations
 African Development Bank (AfDB), Ex-Officio Member of the Board of Governors (since 2021)
 Asian Infrastructure Investment Bank (AIIB), Ex-Officio Member of the Board of Governors (since 2021)
 European Bank for Reconstruction and Development (EBRD), Ex-Officio Member of the Board of Governors (since 2021)
 Inter-American Development Bank (IDB), Ex-Officio Member of the Board of Governors (since 2021)
 International Monetary Fund (IMF), Ex-Officio Member of the Board of Governors (since 2021)

References

|-

Draghi Cabinet
1953 births
Living people
Finance ministers of Italy
Italian economists
Italian bankers
Italian civil servants
People from the Province of Belluno
University of Padua alumni
Independent politicians in Italy